Duke of Leeds was a title in the Peerage of England. It was created in 1694 for the prominent statesman Thomas Osborne, 1st Marquess of Carmarthen, who had been one of the Immortal Seven in the Revolution of 1688. He had already succeeded as 2nd Baronet, of Kiveton (1647) and been created Viscount Osborne, of Dunblane (1673), Baron Osborne, of Kiveton in the County of York (also 1673) and Viscount Latimer, of Danby in the County of York (also 1673), Earl of Danby, in the County of York (1674), and Marquess of Carmarthen (1689). All these titles were in the Peerage of England, except for the viscountcy of Osborne, which was in the Peerage of Scotland. He resigned the latter title in favour of his son in 1673. The Earldom of Danby was a revival of the title held by his great-uncle, Henry Danvers, 1st Earl of Danby (see Earl of Danby).

History
The Dukedom was named for Leeds in Yorkshire, and did not (as is sometimes claimed) refer to Leeds Castle in Kent. The principal ducal seat was Kiveton Hall. After Kiveton Hall was demolished in 1811, Hornby Castle became the main seat of the Dukes of Leeds. The traditional burial place of the Dukes of Leeds was All Hallows Church, Harthill, South Yorkshire.

The 4th Duke married Mary Godolphin, daughter of Henrietta Churchill Godolphin, suo jure Duchess of Marlborough, and The 2nd Earl of Godolphin, and assumed the arms of Godolphin and Churchill.

On 8 August 1849, The 7th Duke of Leeds assumed by royal licence the additional surname and arms of D'Arcy, for the separate baronies of D'Arcy (1322) and Conyers that he inherited through his grandmother.

Upon the death of the 7th Duke in 1859, the dukedom passed to his cousin, The 2nd Baron Godolphin, whose father (the second son of The 5th Duke of Leeds) had been created Baron Godolphin, of Farnham Royal in the County of Buckingham, in 1832.

The 11th Duke was married three times; he had a daughter, Lady Camilla Osborne, but no son. Upon his death in 1963, the dukedom passed to his cousin, Sir D'Arcy Osborne, a diplomat. Eight months later, the 12th Duke died in Rome, unmarried, at which point the dukedom and the Barony of Godolphin became extinct.

The heir apparent to the Duke of Leeds was styled Marquess of Carmarthen; Lord Carmarthen's heir apparent was styled Earl of Danby; and Lord Danby's heir apparent was styled Viscount Latimer.

Osborne Baronets, of Kiveton (1620)
Sir Edward Osborne, 1st Baronet (1596–1647)
Sir Thomas Osborne, 2nd Baronet (1632–1712) (created Viscount Osborne in 1673, Earl of Danby in 1673, Marquess of Carmarthen in 1689 and Duke of Leeds in 1694)

Dukes of Leeds (1694)
Thomas Osborne, 1st Duke of Leeds (1632–1712)
Edward Osborne, Viscount Latimer (1655–1689), eldest son of the 1st Duke, died without surviving issue
Peregrine Osborne, 2nd Duke of Leeds (1659–1729), second son of the 1st Duke
Peregrine Hyde Osborne, 3rd Duke of Leeds (1691–1731), only son of the 2nd Duke
Thomas Osborne, 4th Duke of Leeds (1713–1789), only son of the 3rd Duke
Thomas Osborne, Marquess of Carmarthen (1747), eldest son of the 4th Duke, died during his father's lifetime
Francis Godolphin Osborne, 5th Duke of Leeds (1751–1799), third son of the 4th Duke
Other titles (6th & 7th Dukes):  Baron Darcy de Knayth (1322) and Baron Conyers (1509)
George William Frederick Osborne, 6th Duke of Leeds (1775–1838), eldest son of the 5th Duke
Francis George Godolphin D'Arcy D'Arcy-Osborne, 7th Duke of Leeds (1798–1859), eldest son of the 6th Duke, died without issue
Other titles (8th Duke onwards): Baron Godolphin (1832)
George Godolphin Osborne, 8th Duke of Leeds (1802–1872), eldest son of the 5th Duke's second son, The Lord Godolphin
George Godolphin Osborne, 9th Duke of Leeds (1828–1895), eldest son of the 8th Duke
George Osborne, Earl of Danby (1861), eldest son of the 9th Duke (then Lord Carmarthen), died in infancy during his grandfather's lifetime
George Godolphin Osborne, 10th Duke of Leeds (1862–1927), second son of the 9th Duke
John Francis Godolphin Osborne, 11th Duke of Leeds (1901–1963), only son of the 10th Duke, died without male issue
Francis D'Arcy Godolphin Osborne, 12th Duke of Leeds (1884–1964), grandson of Lord Godolphin's third son, died without issue, at which point all of his titles became extinct

Family tree

Notes

References

Source

Extinct dukedoms in the Peerage of England
 Duke
British landowners
Noble titles created in 1694
Dukes of Leeds